Flavius Probus (floruit 510–513) was a Roman politician and consul for 513.

He came from a family renowned for its learning, and he himself is praised for his culture by Ennodius (Letters, VIII.21, autumn 510).

In 512 he was a vir illustris; the following year he held the consulate.

Bibliography 
 Arnold Hugh Martin Jones, John Martindale, John Morris, "Fl. Probus 9", The Prosopography of the Later Roman Empire (PLRE). vol. 3, Cambridge 1992, p. 913.

6th-century Italo-Roman people
6th-century Roman consuls
Imperial Roman consuls